Friedhelm Frischenschlager (born 6 October 1943 in Salzburg) is an Austrian politician and served in the European Parliament. Originally he was a member of the Freedom Party of Austria before co-founding the Liberal Forum in 1993.

Career
Frischenshlager's political career spanned over 4 decades from the 1970s to 2000s. 

His career started as a member of the Liberal Party of Austria and deputy of the National Assembly (since 1977).  He served as the Federal Minister for Defense (1983–1986) under the administrations of Fred Sinowatz and Norbert Steger. He also served as the party's Deputy Head / Floor Leaders from 1986–1990.

On 4 February 1993, Frischenschlager was one of the liberal members in the Freedom Party of Austria (FPÖ), including five members of the National Council of Austria, who left the party and founded the Liberal Forum. The five National members who co-founded LIF are Heide Schmidt, Klara Motter, Friedhelm Frischenschlager, Hans Helmut Moser, and Thomas Barmüller. 

Frischenshlager also served in the European Parliament (1996–1999), Director of the department of democratization of the OSCE Mission in Kosovo (2001–2003), and Secretary General of the Union of European Federalists, Brussels (UEF) (since 2005).

In 2006, he became Administrative Head of the post graduate Course of Balkan Studies, University of Vienna (post graduate), together with the Institute for the Danube Region and Central Europe (IDM).

Controversy
Frischenschlager (FPÖ) as Defense Minister officially welcomed 24 January 1985 at Graz-Thalerhof airport, former SS-Sturmbannführer Walter Reder, who had flown to Austria for 34 years in prison. in the Italian fortress Gaeta. This gesture of a member of the Austrian government towards the previously released Austrian National Socialist war criminal - Commander one of Battalion of 16th SS Panzergrenadier Division Reichsführer-SS accused of the Marzabotto massacre in October 1944 - sparked international scandal.

References

1943 births
Living people
Austrian politicians